Piacenti is an Italian surname. Notable people with the surname include:

Alessandro Piacenti (born 1992), Italian footballer
Gesualdo Piacenti (born 1954), Italian footballer
Kirsten Aschengreen Piacenti (1929-2021),  Danish art historian and museum director 

Italian-language surnames